Homeobox protein DLX-5 is a protein that in humans is encoded by the distal-less homeobox 5 gene, or DLX5 gene. DLX5 is a member of DLX gene family.

Function 

This gene encodes a member of a homeobox transcription factor gene family similar to the Drosophila distal-less (Dll) gene. The encoded protein may play a role in bone development and fracture healing. Current research holds that the homeobox gene family is important in appendage development. DLX5 and DLX6 can be seen to work in conjunction and are both necessary for proper craniofacial, axial, and appendicular skeleton development. Mutation in this gene, which is located in a tail-to-tail configuration with another member of the family on the long arm of chromosome 7, may be associated with split-hand/split-foot malformation.

DLX5 also acts as the early BMP-responsive transcriptional activator needed for osteoblast differentiation by stimulating the up-regulation of a variety of promoters (ALPL promoter, SP7 promoter, MYC promoter).

Clinical significance 

Mutations in the DLX5 gene have been shown to be involved in the hand and foot malformation syndrome. SHFM is a heterogenous limb defect in which the development of the central digital rays is hindered, leading to missing central digits and claw-like distal extremities. Other defects associated with DLX5 include sensorineural hearing loss, mental retardation, ectodermal and craniofacial findings, and orofacial clefting.

In mice, the targeted disruption of DLX1, DLX2, DLX1/2, or DLX5 orthologs yields craniofacial, bone, and vestibular defects. If DLX5 is disrupted in conjunction with DLX6, bone, inner ear, and severe craniofacial defects are prevalent. Research utilizing Dlx5/6-nulls suggests that these genes have both unique and redundant functions.

Developmental Stage
DLX5 begins to express DLX5 protein in the facial and branchial arch mesenchyme, otic vesicles, and frontonasal ectoderm at around day 8.5-9. By day 12.5, DLX5 protein begins to be expressed in the brain, bones, and all remaining skeletal structures. Expression in the brain and skeleton begins to decrease by day 17.

Interactions 

DLX5 has been shown to interact with DLX1, DLX2, DLX6, MSX1 and MSX2.

References

Further reading

External links 
 

Transcription factors